Addiego is a surname. Notable people with the surname include:

Dawn Addiego (born 1962), American politician
Rafael Addiego Bruno (1923–2014), Uruguayan lawyer, judge, and politician